Shibli Sadique is a Bangladesh Awami League politician and the incumbent Member of Parliament from Dinajpur-6. His father, Md. Mostafizur Rahman Fizu, also represented Dinajpur-6 in the Jatiya Sangsad.

Career
Sadique was elected to Parliament on 5 January 2014 from Dinajpur-6 as a Bangladesh Awami League candidate.

Sadique married folk singer Salma Akhter on 25 January 2011. They divorced in 2016.

References

Awami League politicians
Living people
10th Jatiya Sangsad members
11th Jatiya Sangsad members
Year of birth missing (living people)
People from Dinajpur District, Bangladesh